Milagros is the second major-label album, second Spanish language album, and third album overall by Mexican-American singer Myra. It was released under Hollywood Records on October 16, 2001. The album was a re-release of Myra's debut album the self-titled "Myra", all songs were re-recorded from English to Spanish (Myra's native language). The songs were translated by Marco Marinangeli. The single, "Siempre Hay Milagros" was met with a fresh new video with scenes from the original English version. "Bailando En La Ciudad" was utilized as a promo track for the 2002 Disney Channel's Original Movie, "Gotta Kick It Up!" Myra was not featured in the promotional video.

Track listing

2001 albums
Myra (singer) albums
Spanish-language albums